Paul Sauvage may refer to:

 Paul Sauvage (footballer) (1939–2020), French footballer
 Paul Sauvage (aviator) (1897–1917), French World War I flying ace

See also
 Paul Savage (disambiguation)